Peculiarities of the Russian Bath is a 1999 Russian erotic film directed by Aleksey Rudakov. It was filmed in the wake of the success of Alexander Rogozhkin’s film Peculiarities of the National Hunt and subsequent sequels.

The film is included in the list of films banned for open screening in the Republic of Belarus.

Plot
In the center of the plot of the film are three erotic tales told by the attendant Mitrich to a tipsy company who came to take a steam bath in a Russian bath.

Cast
 Viktor Bychkov as  Mitrich
 Alexander Pyatkov as carpenter
 Oksana Stashenko as mistress
 Vyacheslav Kulakov as godparent
 Lyubov Tikhomirova as bath attendant
 Mikhail Kotov  as German officer
 Lyubov Rusakova  as blonde

Critical response
Film critic Sergey Kudryavtsev twice included the film in his anti-ratings, including as the worst film in a quarter of a century, assigning him 1 point out of 10 possible.

Lyubov Arkus notes the successful choice of Viktor Bychkov for the lead role.

References

External links 
 
1992 films
1990s Russian-language films
Russian sex comedy films
1990s sex comedy films

Pornographic parody films